Ryan Campbell (born 1972) is an Australian cricketer.

Ryan Campbell may also refer to:

Ryan Campbell (lacrosse)
Ryan Campbell (ice hockey, born 1979), ice hockey player for Braehead Clan
Ryan Campbell (ice hockey, born 1970), ice hockey player for Guildford Flames
Ryan Campbell (pilot), see Cirrus SR22

See also
Ryan Campbell-Gordon, English footballer